Ezequiel Marcelo Garay González (born 10 October 1986) is an Argentine former professional footballer who played as a central defender.

He started his career with Newell's Old Boys but moved to Spain at the age of 19, going on to amass La Liga totals of 201 games and 21 goals over ten seasons with Racing de Santander, Real Madrid and Valencia. In 2011 he signed with Benfica, winning four major titles, most notably the domestic treble in 2013–14.

Garay represented Argentina at the 2014 World Cup and two Copa América tournaments.

Club career

Early years
Garay was born in Rosario, Santa Fe. At the early age of 18, he made his professional debut for hometown's Newell's Old Boys, in the Primera División. His first match was against Club de Gimnasia y Esgrima La Plata, as the local team eventually won the Apertura championship in the 2004–05 season.

Garay made another 12 league appearances for Newell's, scoring his first and only goal for the club in the local derby against Rosario Central, a 2–1 win.

Racing Santander
Garay joined La Liga club Racing de Santander in December 2005, helping with seven complete matches as the Cantabria side barely avoided relegation. His first full season was nothing short of spectacular as he netted nine league goals in 31 games, being the second top scorer in his position in Europe's major leagues only behind Inter Milan's Marco Materazzi (ten); against Real Madrid only, he scored three times – 2–1 home victory (both through penalties, as well as five other goals) and 3–1 away loss – as Racing eventually finished tenth, their best since returning to the top flight in 2002.

On 19 March 2008, in the semi-finals of the Copa del Rey against Getafe CF, Garay suffered a serious leg injury which put him out of action for the remainder of the campaign. He still scored three goals in 22 matches with his team finishing in a best-ever sixth position, qualifying for the first time to the UEFA Cup– one of those came on 30 September 2007 in a 1–0 win at UD Almería.

Real Madrid
On 18 May 2008, Racing sold Garay to Real Madrid, but received the player again on a season-long loan. Returned in July 2009, he made his league debut for the latter on 29 August, in the opening game of the campaign against Deportivo de La Coruña, a 3–2 home win. On 12 December, after coming on as a substitute for severely injured Pepe, he scored his first goal for the club, heading in a free kick from Xabi Alonso to make it 3–2 at Valencia CF with six minutes to go.

Garay was only fourth-choice stopper in 2010–11 under new manager José Mourinho, only making five league appearances, adding two in the Spanish Cup (including one minute in the final against FC Barcelona, a 1–0 extra-time triumph).

Benfica

On 5 July 2011, Garay transferred to S.L. Benfica for a fee of €5.5 million, signing a four-year contract; initially part of the deal that sent Fábio Coentrão to Real Madrid, Garay eventually signed a separate deal. Real Madrid also remained eligible for 50% of any transfer fee Benfica would receive, and the latter also sold part of his rights to Benfica Stars Fund for €1.175 million, making the club owner of 40%.

During his spell in Lisbon, Garay shared teams with a host of compatriots, and often partnered with Luisão in central defence. On 24 April 2014, he scored his eighth official goal of the season, his team's first in a 2–1 home win over Juventus F.C. in the first leg of the Europa League semi-finals.

Zenit
On 25 June 2014, Russian club FC Zenit Saint Petersburg signed Garay in a transfer totalling €6 million, with Benfica receiving €2.4 million for their 40% part of the player's rights.

He appeared in 42 games in all competitions in his first season, helping the team to their fourth Russian Premier League championship.

Valencia
On 31 August 2016, Garay joined Valencia for a fee reported at around €20 million. He scored four goals in his debut campaign, but his side could only finish 12th.

Garay was on the starting XI in the 2019 Copa del Rey Final, a 2–1 defeat of Barcelona. In February 2020, after suffering a cruciate ligament injury to his right knee which would sideline him for up to six months, he asked to be released so that another player in his position could be signed.

Having been without a club for over one year, the 34-year-old Garay announced his retirement on 16 July 2021. He revealed that he had been suffering with a long-term injury since 2018 and had had offers since leaving Valencia, but felt that it would have been dishonest to accept them since the injury situation would have meant he would only have been available for one game out of every three.

International career

In 2005, Garay helped the Argentine under-20s win the FIFA U-20 World Cup in the Netherlands. That side also included Sergio Agüero, Fernando Gago, Lionel Messi and Oscar Ustari.

Garay earned his first cap for the senior team cap in a friendly against Norway, a 2–1 loss on 22 August 2007. He had previously been called in May by coach Alfio Basile to a series of friendlies prior to the 2007 Copa América, but injury prevented him from appearing in those matches and the official competition.

Garay was selected by new national team manager Sergio Batista to the 2011 Copa América. He was also picked by the following coach, Alejandro Sabella, for his 2014 FIFA World Cup squad, making his debut in the competition on 15 June by featuring the full 90 minutes in a 2–1 group stage win over Bosnia and Herzegovina. He was first-choice in all the remaining games and, on 9 July, converted his penalty shootout attempt against the Netherlands (0–0 after 120 minutes) to send his country to the final for the first time in 24 years.

Garay made the list for the 2015 Copa América, starting in the team's opening fixture with Paraguay in La Serena (2–2).

Personal life
On 15 March 2020, Garay became the first La Liga player to test positive for COVID-19. On 21 September 2021, shortly following his retirement, he was reported to have started real estate development in Valencia.

Career statistics

Club

International
Source:

Honours
Newell's Old Boys
Argentine Primera División: 2004 Apertura

Real Madrid
Copa del Rey: 2010–11

Benfica
Primeira Liga: 2013–14
Taça de Portugal: 2013–14
Taça da Liga: 2011–12, 2013–14
UEFA Europa League runner-up: 2012–13, 2013–14

Zenit Saint Petersburg
Russian Premier League: 2014–15
Russian Cup: 2015–16
Russian Super Cup: 2016

Valencia
Copa del Rey: 2018–19
Argentina U17
FIFA U-17 World Cup third place: 2003

Argentina U20
FIFA U-20 World Cup: 2005

Argentina U23
Summer Olympic Games: 2008

Argentina
FIFA World Cup runner-up: 2014
Copa América runner-up: 2015
Individual
UEFA Europa League Squad of the Season: 2013–14

References

External links

1986 births
Living people
Argentine footballers
Footballers from Rosario, Santa Fe
Association football defenders
Argentine Primera División players
Newell's Old Boys footballers
La Liga players
Racing de Santander players
Real Madrid CF players
Valencia CF players
Primeira Liga players
S.L. Benfica footballers
Russian Premier League players
FC Zenit Saint Petersburg players
Argentina youth international footballers
Argentina under-20 international footballers
Argentina international footballers
2011 Copa América players
2014 FIFA World Cup players
2015 Copa América players
Olympic footballers of Argentina
Footballers at the 2008 Summer Olympics
Medalists at the 2008 Summer Olympics
Olympic gold medalists for Argentina
Olympic medalists in football
Argentine expatriate footballers
Expatriate footballers in Spain
Expatriate footballers in Portugal
Expatriate footballers in Russia
Argentine expatriate sportspeople in Spain
Argentine expatriate sportspeople in Portugal
Argentine expatriate sportspeople in Russia